Ronnie Golden, born Tony De Meur, is a British singer, guitarist and comedian. He was the founder of the band The Fabulous Poodles. After the group broke up, he worked as a comedian as a member of The Comic Strip. From the early 1980s he made many appearances at The Comedy Store and on the London alternative comedy circuit. He appeared in the second episode of the comedy series, The Young Ones, hanging upside-down from the ceiling as Buddy Holly still in his parachute.

Golden now fronts an R&B and soul group, Ronnie and the Rex. He also writes songs and sketches for BBC Radio 4's The Right Time.

A long-time musical collaborator with Barry Cryer, Golden and Cryer performed at the Nine Lessons and Carols for Godless People show at The Bloomsbury Theatre and Hammersmith Apollo in December 2009. Cryer and Golden's performance was broadcast on BBC Four on 23 January 2010.

References

British comedians
British male guitarists
Living people
Year of birth missing (living people)